The  British Horse Society Equestrian Hall of Fame was launched in 2005 to pay homage to the people and horses who have made outstanding contributions to the sport of Equestrianism in Great Britain.  Elections to the Hall of Fame are made by a Panel of laureates and the British Horse Society Chairman. The panel meets annually to consider suggestions put forward from within the panel, BHS Members, and by the general public. On 20 February, 2008 a wall of plaques at the Household Cavalry’s barracks in Knightsbridge, London were revealed in a ceremony by Anne, Princess Royal.

Laureates
Historic Horsemen and horses announced on 29 July 2005 at the Royal International Horse Show, Hickstead.
 Dorian Williams
 Pat Smythe
 Sheila Willcox
 Ginny Leng 
 Col Harry Llewellyn
 Richard Meade
 Col Sir Michael Ansell
 Anna Sewell
 David Broome
 Harvey Smith
 HRH The Princess Royal
 Cynthia Haydon
 George Bowman
 Mrs VDS Williams
 Lorna Johnstone
 Priceless
 King's Warrior 
 Dutch Courage 
 Cornishman 
 Doublet
 Sefton
 Foxhunter
 Milton
 Penwood Forge Mill 
 Stroller
 Be Fair
 High & Mighty 
Laureates announced on 22 November 2005
 Pippa Funnell
 Lucinda Green
 Lee Pearson
 Primmore's Pride 
 Arko lll
 John Whitaker
 Carl Hester
 Shear H2O
Laureates announced on 7 June 2006
 Jennie Loriston-Clarke
 Robert Oliver
 Captain Mark Phillips
 Bertie Hill
 Caroline Bradley
 Tosca 
 Beethoven 
 Marion Mould 
 Nick Skelton
 Douglas Bunn
Laureates announced on 9 January 2007
 Ted Edgar
 Liz Edgar
 HRH The Duke of Edinburgh 
 Mary King
 Wilf White
 Colton Maelstrom
 Ryan's Son
Laureates announced 20 February 2008
 Mary Gordon-Watson
 William Fox-Pitt
 Nizefella 
 Everest Forever
 The Poacher 

Laureates announced 17 November 2008
 Ann Moore
 Ian Stark 
 Michael Whitaker
 Mr Softee
 Over to You

Laureates inducted October 2010
 Anneli Drummond-Hay
 Malcolm Pyrah 
 Count Robert Orssich 
 Merely-A-Monarch 

Laureates inducted November 2011
 Laura Bechtolsheimer
     
Laureates inducted December 2012
 Sophie Christiansen
 Charlotte Dujardin
 Ben Maher
 Vin Toulson
 Mistral Hojris 
 Pretty Polly

Laureates inducted November 2013
 Kristina Cook
 Toytown

Laureates inducted November 2014
 William Funnell
 Jane Holderness-Roddam
 Valegro
 Big Star

Laureates inducted November 2015
 Scott Brash
 Jayne Ross
 Hello Sanctos 
 Headley Britannia

Laureates inducted November 2016
 Christopher Bartle
 Avebury
 Chilli Morning 
 Opposition Buzz 
 Philco

Laureates inducted November 2018
 Natasha Baker MBE

See also
 List of historical horses

References

Show jumping
Sports halls of fame